General (Ret.) Lee Sang-hee (born 1945), ROKA, was the 32nd Chairman of the Joint Chiefs of Staff of the Republic of Korea Armed Forces and the 41st Republic of Korea Minister of National Defense.

General Lee graduated from the Republic of Korea Military Academy in 1970 and the College of Liberal Arts & Science, Seoul National University in 1974.

His assignments as a general officer were Chief of Force Planning, ROK Army Headquarters (1995-1996), Commanding General, 30th Infantry Division (Mechanized) (1996-1998), Director General, Policy Planning Bureau, Ministry of National Defense (1998-1999), Commanding General, V Corps (1999-2001), Chief Director, Strategy & Plans, Joint Chiefs of Staff (2001-2002), and Chief Director, Joint Operations Headquarters, Joint Chiefs of Staff (2002-2003).

He was promoted to 4-star general and assumed command of Third ROK Army in 2003.

In 2005, he was appointed the 32nd Chairman of the Joint Chiefs of Staff and served in that position until his retirement from the military in 2006.

On 29 February 2008, he assumed the position of Republic of Korea Minister of National Defense, replacing Kim Jang-soo. He served at this position until 2009.

Awards and medals 
 Presidential Citation
 Order of National Security "Samil" Medal
 Order of National Security "Chonsu" Medal
 Order of National Security "Gukson" Medal
 Republic of Turkey Armed Forces Merit Award
 The United States Legion of Merit (Commander & Officer grade)

References

External links 

 https://web.archive.org/web/20071227125004/http://www.jcs.mil.kr/main.html - Republic of Korea Joint Chiefs of Staff (Korean)
 https://web.archive.org/web/20070728195739/http://www.mnd.mil.kr/ - Republic of Korea Ministry of National Defense (Korean)

South Korean generals
Living people
1945 births
Officers of the Legion of Merit
Commanders of the Legion of Merit
Korea Military Academy alumni
Chairmen of the Joint Chiefs of Staff (South Korea)
National Defense ministers of South Korea